Erling Bonnesen (born 28 March 1955 in Nørre Broby) is a Danish politician, who is a member of the Folketing for the Venstre political party. He entered parliament in 2004 after Mariann Fischer Boel resigned her seat.

Political career
Bonnesen was the mayor of Broby Municipality from 1994 and until the municipality was merged with Faaborg, Ringe, Ryslinge and Årslev Municipality in 2007. 

Bonnesen first ran for parliament in the 2001 Danish general election. While he wasn't elected into parliament, he became the primary substitute. When Mariann Fischer Boel then resigned her seat during the 2001-2005 term, on 7 October 2004, Bonnesen entered parliament in her place.

He was elected directly into parliament in the 2005 Danish general election and again in the 2007 election, where he received 9,436 votes. He was reelected in 2011 with 7,819 votes, 2015 with 9,034 votes and 2019 with 8,522 votes.

External links 
 Biography on the website of the Danish Parliament (Folketinget)

References 

Living people
1955 births
People from Faaborg-Midtfyn Municipality
20th-century Danish politicians
Venstre (Denmark) politicians
Danish municipal councillors
Mayors of places in Denmark
Members of the Folketing 2001–2005
Members of the Folketing 2005–2007
Members of the Folketing 2007–2011
Members of the Folketing 2011–2015
Members of the Folketing 2015–2019
Members of the Folketing 2019–2022
Members of the Folketing 2022–2026